Liquid Bridge is a 2003 Australian film starring Ryan Kwanten. The film concerns aspiring pro surfer Nick McCallum (Kwanten), who is held back from achieving fame by his disabled father. However, after being framed for smuggling drugs and jailed, he fights to prove his innocence.

Cast
Ryan Kwanten as Nick McCallum
Simone Kessell as Jeanne
Jarrod Dean as Dane Sanders
Jeremy Sims as Tony
Tony Bonner as Bob McCallum
Carmen Duncan as Vera McCallum
Nathaniel Lees as Ogitani
Lani Tupu as Sharky Garcia
Shane Briant as Carl Sinclair
Linal Haft as Sam Johnson
Mathew Wilkinson as Frank

References

External links

Australian action drama films
2000s English-language films
2000s Australian films